Caner Erdeniz (born 25 April 1987) is a Turkish professional basketball player who last played for Büyükçekmece of the Turkish Basketball Super League (BSL). He is the son of former basketball player Mehmet Erdeniz.

On 23 June 2014 Erdeniz signed a contract with the Turkish team Beşiktaş. He is married to Turkish actress Müge Boz, with whom he has a daughter.

References

External links
TBLStat.net Profile

1987 births
Living people
Büyükçekmece Basketbol players
Galatasaray S.K. (men's basketball) players
Hacettepe Üniversitesi B.K. players
Karşıyaka basketball players
Sportspeople from İzmir
Small forwards
Turkish men's basketball players
21st-century Turkish people